The 1955 Tennessee Volunteers (variously Tennessee, UT, or the Vols) represented the University of Tennessee in the 1955 college football season. Playing as a member of the Southeastern Conference (SEC), the team was led by head coach Bowden Wyatt, in his first year, and played their home games at Shields–Watkins Field in Knoxville, Tennessee. They finished the season with a record of six wins, three losses and one tie (6–3–1 overall, 3–2–1 in the SEC).

Schedule

Roster
 HB #45 Johnny Majors, Jr.

Team players drafted into the NFL

References

Tennessee
Tennessee Volunteers football seasons
Tennessee Volunteers football